Margaret Blake Kelly (born September 17, 1935) is an American businesswoman and former politician from Missouri. She served as the State Auditor of Missouri from 1984 to 1999. She was the first woman to hold statewide office in Missouri, and the fourth Certified Public Accountant to hold the auditor's position.  She is a Republican.

Kelly was born in Crystal City, Missouri.  She received her Bachelor of Science degree in business administration from the University of Missouri in 1957.  She also received a MBA from Missouri State University (then Southwest Missouri State University) in 1975 and earned her CPA certification in 1982.  Before entering public life, Kelly worked for 20 years for various private sector accounting firms.

Kelly's first elected position was as Cole County Auditor. She was elected to that position in 1982.  In July 1984, Governor Kit Bond appointed Kelly as State Auditor, filling a vacancy created by the resignation of James F. Antonio. Upon her appointment, Kelly became the first woman to hold statewide elected office in Missouri. In November of that year, Harriett Woods was elected Lieutenant Governor of Missouri, giving Woods the distinction of being the first woman elected to statewide office.

Kelly was elected to a full term as state auditor in 1986 and was re-elected in 1990 and 1994.  Although she was consistently re-elected as state auditor, Kelly was unsuccessful in her efforts to win other statewide office.  In 1992 she was the Republican nominee for Lieutenant Governor of Missouri, but was defeated by Democrat Roger B. Wilson.  In 1996, she ran against Governor Mel Carnahan, but Carnahan was re-elected by a large margin.  Kelly did not seek re-election in 1998 and retired from public life.

References

|-

1935 births
Living people
Missouri Republicans
Missouri State University alumni
People from Crystal City, Missouri
People from Cole County, Missouri
State Auditors of Missouri
University of Missouri alumni
Women in Missouri politics
21st-century American women